is a Tokyu Corporation Tokyu Tamagawa Line station located in Ōta, Tokyo. Trains run to the terminal Tamagawa Station in the north, and to Kamata Station terminal in the south-east.

Station layout
This station has two ground-level side platforms.

History
March 11, 1923: Opened as Maruko Station of Meguro Kamata Railway.
June 1, 1924: Renamed to Musashi-Maruko Station.
January 1, 1926: Renamed to Numabe Station.

Railway stations in Tokyo
Railway stations in Japan opened in 1923
Tokyu Tamagawa Line
Stations of Tokyu Corporation

References